Jungle beat may refer to:

Donkey Kong Jungle Beat, a 2004 video game
Oldschool jungle, a music genre
A pejorative name for rock and roll
Jungle Beat (TV series), an animated children's television show
Jungle Beat: The Movie, a 2020 computer-animated film